Flå Station is a train station located in Flå, Norway. The station is served by two daily express trains operated by Vy Tog. The station was opened as part of Bergensbanen between Bergen and Gulsvik in 1907. Flå Station is about one kilometre from the town centre.

Railway stations in Buskerud
Railway stations on Bergensbanen
Railway stations opened in 1907